Leonard Myers (November 13, 1827 – February 11, 1905) was a Republican member of the U.S. House of Representatives from Pennsylvania during the American Civil War and the early years of Reconstruction.

Biography
Leonard Myers was born in Attleboro, Pennsylvania (now Langhorne, Pennsylvania).  He attended the University of Pennsylvania at Philadelphia and studied law, but did not earn a degree.

He was major of the Ninth Regiment, Pennsylvania Militia, during the emergency service of September 1862 when Pennsylvania felt threatened by Robert E. Lee during the Maryland Campaign.

He was elected to Congress as a Republican in 1862.  He successfully contested the election of John Moffet to the 41st Congress.  He was reelected in 1868 and served until March 3, 1875.  He served as Chairman of the United States House Committee on Foreign Affairs (42nd United States Congress), United States House Committee on Patents (42nd Congress), and United States House Committee on Private Land Claims (43rd United States Congress).  He was defeated in 1874.

References

External links
 Retrieved on 2008-02-14
The Political Graveyard
Photograph at www.civilwarphotos.net.

1827 births
1905 deaths
University of Pennsylvania alumni
University of Pennsylvania Law School alumni
People of Pennsylvania in the American Civil War
Union Army officers
People from Bucks County, Pennsylvania
Republican Party members of the United States House of Representatives from Pennsylvania
19th-century American politicians
Jewish members of the United States House of Representatives